The Merkabah (Hebrew: מרכבה) is a divine chariot-throne seen by Ezekiel, Isaiah and other Hebrew Bible prophets.

Merkabah may also refer to:

 The Merkava, a series of Israeli main battle tanks
 "Merkaba", a song by American rock band Tool on their Salival album, issued in 2000